The Austrian Eastern Railway (German Ostbahn) was the name of a former railway company during the time of the Austro-Hungarian monarchy. Today, the term is still used to describe certain railway lines (Eastern railway) which were formerly operated by that company.

The Ostbahn was founded as the private Raaber Bahn (or Wien-Raaber-Eisenbahn). The line from Vienna to Bruck an der Leitha was constructed between 1840 and 1846. It was extended to Győr (German Raab) in 1855 and later to Budapest. Later it merged with another private railway company, the Staatseisenbahngesellschaft, which operated the line from Vienna to Pressburg (now Bratislava), and the line via Mistelbach and Laa an der Thaya to Brno. 

The company was nationalized in 1909. After 1945, the service between Laa and Brno was disconnected. The Vienna East Station from which the lines operated had been destroyed in World War II and was merged with the nearby Vienna South Station during reconstruction.

External links 
 Wien-Südbahnhof: Photogallery and documentation about the Vienna Southern Railway Station (Wien-Südbahnhof) by Martin Frey and Philipp Graf

Eastern
Transport in Austria-Hungary
Organizations based in Austria-Hungary